James Hume Nisbet (8 August 1849 – 4 June 1923) was a Scottish-born novelist and artist. Many of his thrillers are set in Australia.

Youth
Nisbet was born in Stirling, Scotland and received special artistic training, and was educated under the Rev. Dr. Culross (later of Bristol College) up to the age of fifteen.

At 16 years of age he went to Australia and stayed about seven years, during which he travelled to Tasmania, New Zealand, and the South Sea Islands, painting, sketching, writing poetry and stories, and making notes for future work. He spent one year of the period acquiring theatrical experience at the Theatre Royal, Melbourne, under the actor Richard Stewart.

Painting
Nisbet returned to London in 1872, and spent some time in studying and copying pictures in the National Gallery and in South Kensington. At the end of the next year he went back to Scotland and devoted himself to art, with an occasional lapse into literature. For eight years he was art master of the Watt Institution and School of Art, Edinburgh. He travelled in Australia and New Guinea again during 1886, and paid a further visit to Australia in 1895. He had studied painting under Sam Bough, R. S. A., but he does not appear to have had any success. He speaks with bitterness of this in a volume called Where Art Begins, which he published in 1892.

Among his best-known paintings are "Eve's first Moonrise," "The Flying Dutchman," "The Dream of Sardanapalus," four pictures of "The Ancient Mariner," and "The Battle of Dunbar."

Writing
Nisbet devoted most of his time to writing. He produced many volumes of verse, books on art and fiction. Several of his novels are coloured by his Australian experiences and appear to have had some success. Miller in his Australian Literature lists about 40 novels published between 1888 and 1905. During the next 10 years he published a few more books, including Hathor and Other Poems, which appeared as the first volume of his poetic and dramatic works in 1905. There was another edition in 1908.

Many of Nisbet's volumes were of ghost stories. These include Paths of the Dead (1899), Stories Weird and Wonderful (1900), and The Haunted Station (1894) whose title story (about a haunted property or "station" in the Australian Outback) has often been reprinted.

Nisbet was a member of the Yorick Club, London, and a friend of Philip Mennell. Nisbet died in Eastbourne, Sussex, England on 4 June 1923.

Bibliography

Novels
The Land of the Hibiscus Blossom: A Yarn of the Papuan Gulf (1888)
Doctor Bernard St. Vincent: A Sensational Romance of Sydney (1889)
Ashes: A Tale of Two Spheres (1890)
Bail Up!: A Romance of Bushrangers and Blacks (1890)
The Black Drop (1891)
The Savage Queen: A Romance of the Natives of Van Dieman's [sic] Land (1891)
The "Jolly Roger". A Story of Sea Heroes and Pirates (1891)
The Bushranger's Sweetheart : An Australian Romance (1892)
The Divers: A Romance of Oceania (1892)
Valdmer the Viking: A Romance of the Eleventh Century by Sea and Land (1893)
The Queen's Desire (1893)
A Bush Girl's Romance (1894)
The Demon Spell (1894)
A Desert Bride (1894)
Her Loving Slave. A Romance of Sedgemoor (1894)
The Great Secret: A Tale of To-morrow (1895)
The Rebel Chief: A Romance of New Zealand (1896)
My Love Noel (1896)
The Swampers: A Romance of the Westralian Goldfields (1897)
A Sweet Sinner (1897)
In Sheep's Clothing: A Romance of Upper Queensland (1900)
Children of Hermes: A Romance of Love and Crime (1901)
A Losing Game: An Australian Tragedy (1901)
A Dream of Freedom: Romance of South America (1902)
A Colonial King (1905)

Collected works
The Haunted Station and Other Stories (1894)
Stories Weird and Wonderful (1900)
Mistletoe Manor (1902)

References

External links

1849 births
1923 deaths
19th-century Australian novelists
19th-century male writers
20th-century Australian novelists
Australian male novelists
Australian poets
Scottish novelists
Scottish poets
Scottish emigrants to Australia
Australian male poets
19th-century British male writers
20th-century Australian male writers